Story is an unincorporated community in Montgomery County, Arkansas, United States. Story has a post office with ZIP code 71970.

The 37.8-mile long Womble Trail connects to the Ouachita National Recreation Trail north of the community.

Education 
Public education for elementary and secondary school students is provided by the Mount Ida School District, which leads to graduation from Mount Ida High School.

References

Unincorporated communities in Montgomery County, Arkansas
Unincorporated communities in Arkansas